Ceratomyxidae is a family of myxozoans.

Genera
 Ceratomyxa Thélohan, 1892
 Ceratonova Atkinson, Foott et Bartholomew, 2014
 Ellipsomyxa Køie, 2003
 Meglitschia Kovaljova, 1988

References

 
Variisporina
Cnidarian families